Dei District is a district of the Western Highlands Province of Papua New Guinea.  Its capital is Dei.  The population of the district was 81,016 at the 2011 census.

References

Districts of Papua New Guinea
Western Highlands Province